The Twelve Apostles may refer to:

Christianity
 Twelve Apostles, the twelve chosen followers of Jesus
 Quorum of the Twelve Apostles (LDS Church), a leadership organization in The Church of Jesus Christ of Latter-day Saints
 Council of Twelve Apostles (Community of Christ) a leadership organization in the Community of Christ
 Quorum of the Twelve, a leadership organization in some denominations within the Latter Day Saint movement
 Twelve Apostles of Ireland, twelve Irish saints of the early Celtic Church
 Twelve Apostles of Mexico, missionaries to New Spain

Stones
 The Twelve Apostles (Victoria), a coastal limestone formation in Australia
 Twelve Apostles Stone Circle, stone circle in Dumfries and Galloway, Scotland
 Twelve Apostles, West Yorkshire, stone circle in West Yorkshire, England

Other
 Twelve Apostles (IRA unit) or "The Squad", an Irish Republican Army unit founded by Michael Collins
 Twelve Apostles (Venezuela), a group of businessmen close to President Carlos Andrés Pérez in the 1970s
 "Green Grow the Rushes, O", a song sometimes called "The Twelve Apostles"
 Dvenadsat Apostolov, a Russian pre-dreadnought battleship in commission from 1892 to 1911.
 Twelve galleons built by Spain after the Armada of 1588, considered the pride of the fleet.
 Ajax Amsterdam's team of the early 1970s, see History of AFC Ajax
 The twelve apostles of Mani in Manichaeism
 Apostle (disambiguation)